1200 series may refer to the following:

Japanese trains
 JR Shikoku 1200 series diesel multiple unit
 Kintetsu 1200 series electric multiple unit
 Meitetsu 1200 series electric multiple unit

Other
 Compaq Presario 1200 series of notebook computers

See also
 1200 (disambiguation)